The Men's Long Jump athletics events for the 2012 Summer Paralympics took place at the London Olympic Stadium from August 31 to September 5. A total of 7 events were contested for 7 different classifications.

Schedule

Results

F11

Note: Small number in brackets is wind speed in metres per second.

F13

F20

F36

F37-38

F42-44

F46

References

Athletics at the 2012 Summer Paralympics
2012 in men's athletics